Aloeides trimeni, the Trimen's copper, is a butterfly of the family Lycaenidae. It is found in South Africa, where it is found from coastal KwaZulu-Natal to the Drakensberg, north into Mpumalanga and Limpopo.

The wingspan is 22–33 mm for males and 24–35 mm for females. Adults are on wing from September to December (with a peak in October) and from January to April (with a peak in February). There are two generations per year.

The larvae feed on Aspalathus species and Hermannia depressa.

Subspecies
Aloeides trimeni trimeni (from the Eastern Cape to Free State, Gauteng and Mpumalanga)
Aloeides trimeni southeayae Tite & Dickson, 1973 (near Mossel Bay in the Western Cape)

References

Butterflies described in 1973
Aloeides
Endemic butterflies of South Africa